Patrick Préjean (born 4 June 1944) is a French actor, known especially for his work in dubbing.  He has also made a career in boulevard theatre.  He is the son of the actor Albert Préjean and the actress Lysiane Rey, and is the father of actress Laura Préjean.

Préjean is best known for dubbing Looney Tunes characters likely Yosemite Sam and Sylvester the Cat, Hamm in Toy Story franchise, Giorgious in Space Goofs, Tigger in Welcome to Pooh Corner, P. Sherman in Finding Nemo, Narrator in Noody, The Blue Aardwark in Pink Panther and Pals and Grandpa Shark in Baby Shark's Big Show!.

Filmography

Films

Television

References

External links

1944 births
Living people
People from Saint-Maur-des-Fossés
French male voice actors
French male film actors
French National Academy of Dramatic Arts alumni